The ZIL-E-167 is an off-road truck designed in the beginning of the 1960s to withstand difficult conditions in Siberia, Urals and far east and northern territories of the Soviet Union. It could cross water and control its tire pressure, and was equipped with air cleaning systems as well as a 4.5 kW electric engine to pump water (in case of fire). It also had radio transmission capabilities.

Built on December 31, 1962 and based on a modified ZIL-135 chassis, the ZIL-E-167 was fitted with two 7.0-liter V8 engines, both of which were located in the rear of the vehicle. The transmissions were from the ZIL-135L. Both front and rear axles were steerable. Air inlets were situated on the sides of the body. The bottom of the vehicle was protected with metal sheets which were meant to improve the vehicle's sliding characteristics in snow. The cab was shared with the BAZ-135 and the wheels were taken from the MAZ-529E.

When factory testing concluded in March 1965 the Ministry of Defence planned to order two more units, but a second prototype was never built.

Mainly due to the complexity of the transmission, the ZIL-E-167 never entered into mass production.

Specifications 
Wheels 6x6
Engine (2xZIL-375)
Engine displacement 2x6.96 liters
Performance 2x180 hp
Fuel tank capacity 900 liters
Fuel consumption 100 liters/100 km
Max speed 65 km/h (on the road fully loaded)
Max speed in 50/80 cm water 30/20 km/h

Measures 
 Length 9260 mm
 Width 3130 mm
 Height 3060 mm
 Ground clearance 750 mm
 Turning radius 11 900 mm
 Wheel diameter 1790 mm

Weights 
 Curb weight 7000 kg
 Payload 5000 kg

Abilities 
 Ability to go through obstacles:
 Trench 2000 mm
 Vertical wall 1000 mm
 Rise angle 42 degrees
 Fording 1800 mm
 Snow 1000 mm

Trucks of the Soviet Union
Off-road vehicles
ZiL vehicles
Rear-engined vehicles
Six-wheel drive